The BC Entertainment Hall of Fame in Vancouver was founded on 24 July 1992 to honour British Columbians that have made outstanding contributions to the entertainment industry. Star Walk inductees are featured with a plaque on the Walk of Fame on Granville Street and in a Starwalk gallery in the Orpheum. Individuals and organizations can be nominated and inducted. The City of Vancouver provides guided tours of the Orpheum and BC Entertainment Hall of Fame Starwalk to which the proceeds go back into the BC Entertainment Hall of Fame fund.

The selection process can take several years from the time the nomination to when its given. Dorothy Davies was one of the first Star Walk inductees.

Inductees

 1992 - Angelina Avison, John Avison, Doris Buckingham
 1993 - Thora Anders, Thor Arngrim, Shirley Broderick
 1994 - Dorothy Davies, Leo Aquino, Bob Hope.
 1995 - Rosemary Deveson, Jack Ammon
 1996 - Elizabeth Ball, Aida Broadbent
 1997 - Daryl Duke
 1998 - Vic Waters and Anna Wyman, Bernard Braden
 1999 - Gerry and Ron Barre, Charlene Brandolini
 2000 - Starwalk: Bruce Allen, John Brockington, Drew Burns.
 2001 - Judith Marcuse, Andrew Allen, Harold Brown.
 2002 - Christopher Gaze, Dee Daniels, Gillian Campbell, Leon Bibb.
 2003 - Choo Chiat and Lin Yee Goh, Terry David Mulligan
 2004 - Double Exposure, Antony Holland, Norma MacMillan, Randy Bachman, Doug Bennett
 2005 - Kathryn Shaw, John Drainie, Dorwin Baird, Norman Campbell.
 2006 - David Cooper, Michael Conway Baker, Reid Anderson
 2007 - Jay Brazeau, Jack Card.
 2008 - Osmond Borradaile, B.B. King
 2009 - Michael Bublé, Wendy Gorling, Jann Arden, Nicholas Campbell.
 2010 - Bruce Greenwood, Bruce Kellett, Bruce Pullan, Susan Jacks, Dave Abbott, Donna Spencer, and Jon Washburn Rae Ackerman, Miles Ramsay.
 2011 - Kazuyoshi Akiyama, Kay Armstrong & Brent Carver.
 2012 - Bryan Adams, Nicola Cavendish
 2013 - Judy Ginn and Jim Walchuk, Bramwell Tovey, Vancouver Symphony Orchestra, Bob Buckley and Ann Watt.
 2014 - Leonard Schein, Spirit of the West
 2016 - Starwalk: Michael J. Fox, Marcus Mosely, Hal Beckett, Jazzy B and Joe Keithly Pioneers: George Calangis, Sharmann King, Tom Lavin, Ian McDougall, Linda McRae, Tab Shori, Renee Cherrier, Rai Purdy, Steve Edge, Filippone Brothers, Crawford Hawkins, Diane Loomer, Carole Tarlington
 2017 - Starwalk: Kirk Shaw, Diane Lines, Gary Fjellgard, 54-40, Valerie Easton, Roy Forbes, Jerry Wasserman, Pioneers: Isy & Richard Walters and Doug Cox
2018 - Doug Cameron, Lloyd Arntzen, Ben Heppner, Nancy Argenta, Todd Kerns, Dan McLeod, Michael Noon, Chin Injeti
2019 - Nardwuar The Human Serviette, Colin James, Bob Buckley, Rick Scott, Joani Taylor, Karin Konoval, Moira Walley-Beckett, Emily Molnar
2021 - Don Alder, Jim Byrnes.
2022 - Mel Warner, R. Paul Dhillon, The Crump Twins, William G. Allman, Paul Shaffer, Peter Reveen.

Founding inductees

 Ivan Ackery
 Thora Anders
 Angelina Avison
 John Avison
 Aida Broadbent
 Jan Cherniavsky
 Robert Clothier
 Joy Coghill
 Eleanor Collins
 Ray Collins

 Jack Cullen
 Dorothy Davies
 Arthur Delamont
 Allard de Ridder
 Fran Dowie
 Yvonne Firkins
 Judith Forst
 Bev Fyfe
 Chris Gage
 Bruno Gerussi

 Irving Guttman
 Lance Harrison
 Bill Henderson
 Jeff Hyslop
 Gerald Jarvis
 Juliette
 Evan Kemp
 Mart Kenney
 Harold Laxton
 Lorraine McAllister

 Fraser MacPherson
 Holly Maxwell
 Barney Potts
 Dal Richards
 Jessie Richardson
 Red Robinson
 June Roper
 Dorothy Somerset
 Calvin Winter

See also
 List of halls and walks of fame
 Canada's Walk of Fame
 List of inductees of Canada's Walk of Fame

References

External links
 Official website

Entertainment halls of fame